The National Aviation Hall of Fame (NAHF) is a museum, annual awards ceremony and learning and research center that was founded in 1962 as an Ohio non-profit corporation in Dayton, Ohio, United States, known as the "Birthplace of Aviation" with its connection to the Wright brothers. In 2017 the annual induction was held in Fort Worth, Texas, as the organization began rotating the ceremony among various cities.

History
On July 14, 1964 the National Aviation Hall of Fame was chartered nationally by an act of the U.S. 88th Congress, public law 88-372 signed by President Lyndon B. Johnson. The organization continues today as a public foundation reporting annually to Congress. The primary support for this foundation comes from private, tax-deductible membership dues and contributions from individuals and organizations.

Its mission is to "honor aerospace legends to inspire future leaders" by realizing the tenacity, vision, persistence, skill and courage of the men and women of the air & space industry.

Principal activities since 1962 are the annual gala induction ceremonies for people selected for enshrinement, typically four to five per year. The selection process for induction into the National Aviation Hall of Fame involves a rigorous review and final selection process by a prestigious and knowledgeable group of aviation and space experts from around the country.

The enshrinement ceremony is often referred to as "The Oscar Night of Aviation". It is held in conjunction with the Wings of Women (WOW) mentoring program.

The National Aviation Hall of Fame is located adjacent to the National Museum of the United States Air Force. The museum covers many areas of flight including military, commercial, general and sport aviation, as well as space flight. It is open year-round with the exception of certain holidays.

Enshrinees
The Hall has inducted the following people, arranged in alphabetical order, with their year of induction in parentheses.

Bert Acosta (2014)
Buzz Aldrin (2000)
John R. Alison (2005)
William McPherson Allen (1971)
William Anders (2004)
Bud Anderson (2008)
Charles Alfred Anderson (2012)
Frank M. Andrews (1986)
Harry George Armstrong (1998)
Neil Alden Armstrong (1979)
Henry Harley Arnold (1967)
J. Leland Atwood (1984)
Bernt Balchen (1973)
Thomas Scott Baldwin (1964)
Lincoln Beachey (1966)
Alan LaVern Bean (2010)
Olive Ann Beech (1981)
Walter Herschel Beech (1977)
Alexander Graham Bell (1965)
Lawrence Dale Bell (1977)
Giuseppe Mario Bellanca (1993)
Vincent Hugo Bendix (1991)
Guion Bluford (2019)
William Edward Boeing (1966)
Charles Bolden (2017)
Richard Bong (1986)
Frank Borman (1982)
Albert Boyd (1984)
Gregory "Pappy" Boyington (2019)
Walter J. Boyne (2007)
Mark E. Bradley (1992)
Patrick Henry Brady (2012)
George Scratchley Brown (1985)
Clayton J. Brukner (1997)
Richard E. Byrd (1968)
Robert Cardenas (2015)
Marion E. Carl (2001)
Eugene Cernan (2000)
Scott Carpenter (2017)
Clyde Vernon Cessna (1978)
Clarence Chamberlin (1976)
Octave Chanute (1963)
Claire Lee Chennault (1972)
Jerrie Cobb (2012)
Jacqueline Cochran (1971)
Eileen Collins (2009)
Michael Collins (1985)
Bessie Coleman (2006)
Harry B. Combs (1996)
Charles Conrad (1980)
Laurence Craigie (2000)
Frederick C. Crawford (1993)
Robert L. Crippen (2016)
Scott Crossfield (1983)
Alfred A. Cunningham (1965)
R. Walter Cunningham (2018)
Glenn Hammond Curtiss (1964)
John R. Dailey (2018)
William H. Dana (2018)
Herbert A. Dargue (1997)
Benjamin O. Davis, Jr. (1994)
George Everett "Bud" Day (2016)
Alexander P. de Seversky (1970)
James Harold Doolittle (1967)
Donald Wills Douglas, Sr. (1969)
Charles Stark Draper (1981)
Charles Duke (2019)
Ira Clarence Eaker (1970)
Amelia Earhart (1968)
Carl Benjamin Eielson (1985)
Theodore G. Ellyson (1964)
Eugene Burton Ely (1965)
Joe H. Engle (2001)
Frank K. Everest (1989)
Sherman Mills Fairchild (1979)
Keith Ferris (2012)
Reuben H. Fleet (1975)
Ronald R. Fogleman (2018)
Anthony Herman Gerard Fokker (1980)
Henry Ford (1984)
Joseph Jacob Foss (1984)
Steve Fossett (2007)
Benjamin Foulois (1963)
Betty Skelton Frankman (2005)
William John Frye (1992)
Fitzhugh Fulton (1999)
Francis Stanley Gabreski (1978)
Dominic S. Gentile (1995)
Hoot Gibson (2012)
Robert J. Gilliland (2017)
Robert R. Gilruth (1994)
John Herschel Glenn (1976)
George William Goddard (1976)
Robert Hutchings Goddard (1966)
Arthur Godfrey (1987)
Barry Morris Goldwater (1982)
Warren G. Grimes (2010)
Virgil I. Grissom (1987)
Robert Ellsworth Gross (1970)
Leroy Randle Grumman (1972)
Harry Frank Guggenheim (1971)
Margaret Hamilton (software engineer) (2022)
Robert N. Hartzell (2015)
Daniel J. Haughton (1987)
Albert Francis Hegenberger (1976)
Edward Henry Heinemann (1981)
David Lee Hill (2006)
Robert A. Hoover (1988)
Howard Hughes (1973)
David Sinton Ingalls (1983)
Daniel James (1993)
Elrey Borge Jeppesen (1990)
Clarence Leonard Johnson (1974)
Evelyn Bryan Johnson (2007)
Alvin M. Johnston (1993)
Thomas V. Jones (1992)
Herbert D. Kelleher (2008)
George Churchill Kenney (1971)
Charles Franklin Kettering (1979)
James Howard Kindelberger (1972)
John and Martha King (2019)
Joe W. Kittinger (1997)
Alan and Dale Klapmeier (2014)
A. Roy Knabenshue (1965)
William J. "Pete" Knight (1988)
Christopher C. Kraft Jr. (2016)
Gene Kranz (2015)
Hershel Clay Lacy (2010)
Frank P. Lahm (1963)
Samuel Pierpont Langley (1963)
William Power Lear (1978)
Curtis Emerson LeMay (1972)
Anthony William LeVier (1978)
Anne Morrow Lindbergh (1979)
Charles Augustus Lindbergh (1967)
Edwin Albert Link (1976)
Allan H. Lockheed (1986)
Grover Loening (1969)
Nancy Harkness Love (2005)
James Arthur Lovell (1998)
Raoul Gervais Lufbery (1998)
Frank Luke (1975)
Paul B. MacCready (1991)
John A. Macready (1968)
Glenn Luther Martin (1966)
David McCampbell (1996)
James McDivitt (2014)
James Smith McDonnell (1977)
Charles McGee (2011)
Thomas McGuire (2000)
John C. Meyer (1988)
Russell W. Meyer, Jr. (2009)
William "Billy" Mitchell (1966)
Marc A. Mitscher (1988)
William A. Moffett (2008)
John J. Montgomery (1964)
Thomas H. Moorer (1987)
Sanford Alexander Moss (1976)
Gerhard Neumann (1986)
Ruth Rowland Nichols (1992)
Carl L. Norden (1994)
John Knudsen Northrop (1974)
Robin Olds (2001)
Clyde Edward Pangborn (1995)
William Allan Patterson (1976)
Frank Piasecki (2002)
William Thomas Piper (1980)
Harold Frederick Pitcairn (1995)
Paul Howard Poberezny (1999)
Thomas Paul Poberezny (2016)
Wiley Hardeman Post (1969)
Harriet Quimby (2004)
Albert Cushing Read (1965)
Robert Campbell Reeve (1965)
Frederick Brant Rentschler (1982)
Ben Rich (2005)
Holden Chester Richardson (1978)
Edward Vernon Rickenbacker (1965)
Sally Ride (2007)
Jack Ridley (2004)
Cliff Robertson (2006)
Calbraith Perry Rodgers (1964)
Will Rogers (1977)
Robert A. Rushworth (1990)
Burt Rutan (1995)
Dick Rutan (2002)
T. Claude Ryan (1974)
Walter M. Schirra (1986)

Bernard Adolf Schriever (1980)
Thomas Selfridge (1965)
Alan Shepard (1977)
Igor Ivan Sikorsky (1968)
Abe Silverstein (2015)
Robert Forman Six (1980)
Donald K. Slayton (1996)
C. R. Smith (1974)
Frederick W. Smith (2007)
Carl Andrew Spaatz (1967)
Elmer Ambrose Sperry (1973)
Lawrence Burst Sperry (1981)
Thomas P. Stafford (1997)
Robert M. Stanley (1990)
John Paul Stapp (1985)
Lloyd Stearman (1989)
James Stewart (2009)
Katherine Stinson (2019)
James Stockdale (2002)
Charles Edward Taylor (1965)
Louise Thaden (1999)
Lowell Thomas (1992)
Paul W. Tibbets (1996)
John Henry Towers (1966)
Juan Terry Trippe (1970)
Sean D. Tucker (2008)
Roscoe Turner (1975)
Nathan Farragut Twining (1976)
Albert Lee Ueltschi (2001)
Hoyt S. Vandenberg (1991)
Wernher von Braun (1982)
Theodore von Kármán (1983)
Hans P. von Ohain (1990)
Chance M. Vought (1989)
Leigh Wade (1974)
Patty Wagstaff (2004)
Henry W. Walden (1964)
Dwane Wallace (2012)
Emily Warner (2014)
Edward White (2009)
Robert M. White (2006)
Frank Whittle (2017)
Noel Wien (2010)
Sam Barlow Williams (1998)
Thornton Arnold Wilson (1983)
Steve Wittman (2014)
Collett Everman Woolman (1994)
Orville and Wilbur Wright (1962)
Charles Elwood Yeager (1973)
John W. Young (1988)
Hubert Zemke (2002)

See also

 North American aviation halls of fame
 Wright Brothers Memorial Trophy
 Living Legends of Aviation

References

External links

Aviation halls of fame
Aerospace museums in Ohio
Aviation
Biographical museums in Ohio
Museums in Dayton, Ohio
Wright-Patterson Air Force Base
Patriotic and national organizations chartered by the United States Congress
501(c)(3) organizations